Karnataka State Open University (KSOU) is a distance learning university founded in 1996, located in Mysore in the Indian state of Karnataka.

Controversy

De-recognition and re-recognition 

UGC de-recognized several courses of KSOU with effect from 2012-13. The university was de-recognized in 2015 after it was found violating several norms of UGC and DEC, IGNOU. The university had violated the norms related to territorial jurisdiction by establishing study centres across India and also offered admission to courses within India and abroad in violation of regulations. Even after a show cause notice was issued, it continued this practice. Thousands of students were jeopardized by the de-recognition leading to protests by students and petitions to the Karnataka High Court/Supreme Court (Supreme Court Case No.001037 or Diary No.31227 filled on August 21, 2018). After several initiatives by KSOU, the Government of Karnataka and the direction of the high court, 17 courses of KSOU were granted recognition from 2018 onwards. However, lives of earlier students remain in limbo without degrees, though a bridge course and a test is likely to be conducted. In 2018 UGC gave programme-level recognition from 2018-19 to 2022-23 via UGC order F.No. 1-6/2018 (DEB-I) dated 03-10-2018 for B.A.,B.Com.B.L.I.sc.,M.L.ISc.,M.A., M.Com.,M.Sc.

References

External links 
 

Open universities in India
Universities in Mysore
Educational institutions established in 1996
Universities established in the 1990s
1996 establishments in Karnataka